Euthycerina is a genus of flies in the family Sciomyzidae, the marsh flies or snail-killing flies.

Species
E. pilosa Malloch, 1933
E. vittithorax Malloch, 1933

References

Sciomyzidae
Sciomyzoidea genera